Brenna Lynn Flaugher is an experimental cosmologist who works as a distinguished scientist at Fermilab, where she heads the Astrophysics Department. Flaugher led the development of the Dark Energy Camera at the Víctor M. Blanco Telescope in Chile, part of the Dark Energy Survey; she has also been involved in the development of the Dark Energy Spectroscopic Instrument at the Kitt Peak National Observatory in Arizona. By seeking a greater understanding of dark matter, she aims to explain the observed accelerating expansion of the universe.

Education
Flaugher graduated from Bates College in 1983. She completed her doctorate at Rutgers University in 1989, under the supervision of Thomas J. Devlin.

Recognition
Flaugher was named a Fellow of the American Physical Society (APS) in 2011, after a nomination by the APS Division of Astrophysics, "for her important contributions to experimental particle astrophysics, particularly her leadership of and seminal contributions to the design and construction of the Dark Energy Camera".

In 2020, Fermilab named Flaugher a distinguished scientist.

References

Year of birth missing (living people)
Living people
American physicists
American cosmologists
American women physicists
Bates College alumni
Rutgers University alumni
People associated with Fermilab
21st-century American women
Fellows of the American Physical Society